The Monash University Faculty of Science is one of the largest science faculties in Australia, with over 4,000 students. It offers both undergraduate and postgraduate courses, from Bachelor's degrees through to Masters and PhDs.  It is based at the Monash Clayton campus in Melbourne, and has extended to Selangor, Malaysia as the School of Science.

The Faculty offers units of study and research in Biological Sciences, Chemistry, Earth, Atmosphere and Environment, Mathematics, and Physics and Astronomy.

In addition to the Bachelor of Science degree, the Faculty of Science offers two unique Advanced Honours degrees: the Bachelor of Science Advanced - Global Challenges (Honours) and the Bachelor of Science Advanced - Research (Honours).

Rankings
The School of Chemistry within the Faculty was ranked the best in Australia for both teaching and research according to the Academic Ranking of World Universities 2015.

Research centres and platforms
The Faculty of Science operates, and is associated with, a number of collaborative research centres and platforms encouraging research and industry collaboration including:

 The Monash Centre for Astrophysics, one of the most diverse astrophysics groups in Australia.
 The Monash Centre for Atomically Thin Materials, the first centre of its kind in Australia, bringing together international research and design in 2-D materials such as graphene.
 The ARC Centre of Excellence for Particle Physics at the Terascale
 The Monash Academy for Cross & Interdisciplinary Mathematical Applications (MAXIMA)
Victorian Centre for Sustainable Chemical Manufacturing (VCSCM)
The Chemicals and Plastics (C&P) Manufacturing GRIP

ERA results 2015 (Excellence in Research for Australia)
Most scientific disciplines within the Monash Faculty of Science saw an increase in ERA ratings from 2012 to 2015.

Physical Sciences and Chemical Sciences achieved an overall rating of 5 in 2015 - well above world standard - with Mathematical Sciences and Biological Sciences achieving an overall rating of 4 - above world standard.

Facilities and infrastructure
A significant investment has been made in infrastructure at Monash University’s Faculty of Science including the recent development of a multi-million dollar Science Precinct, housing new buildings and facilities for students and academics.  This includes a new $79.5M chemistry building.

Examples of innovation include the PACE (Physics and Astronomy Collaborative-learning Environment) studio, which reconsiders approaches to teaching Physics and Astronomy.

Schools in the Faculty of Science
 School of Biological Sciences
 School of Chemistry
 School of Earth, Atmosphere and Environment
 School of Mathematical Sciences
 School of Physics and Astronomy
 Monash University Malaysia, School of Science

Notable alumni
The Faculty of Science has produced a number of notable graduates who are leaders in their field, including:

Greg Ayers – Director of the Australian Bureau of Meteorology
Peter Carey – Booker prize-winning novelist
Damian Conway – Computer scientist
Hugh Evans – Young Australian of the Year and founder of the Oaktree Foundation
Tim Flannery – Writer, scientist, Australian of the Year 2007
Peter Arthur Fox – Professor, scientist (known for: defining Informatics and Data Science in Earth Sciences; defining the Sun–Earth Connections Research Agenda and Convening the Community)
Gail Gago – South Australian Minister for Environment, Conservation and Mental Health
Lauren Hewitt – Australian athlete
Geoff Hunt – World champion squash player
Paul McNamee – Former tennis player and sports administrator
John Thwaites – Former Deputy Premier of Victoria and Minister for Environment, Water and Climate Change
Anna Wilson – World champion cyclist
Greg Wilton – Politician
Michael Wooldridge – Former Australian Minister for Health and Chairman of UNAIDS

References

External links

Science